The River Teme is a river in England and Wales.

Teme may also refer to:

Rivers
 Teme River, New Zealand

Other uses
 Teme (philosophy), a term meaning technological meme
Teme language, a language of Nigeria
 True Equator, Mean Equinox frame used in the Earth-centered inertial coordinate system
 Trade Union for Theatre and Media (Teme), Finland

See also

Temes (disambiguation)